Juliana Snapper is an opera singer, voice researcher and artist. She received her B.M. in vocal performance from the Oberlin Conservatory where she studied under Richard Miller, and her M.A. in critical musicology at University of California, San Diego.

Snapper creates performances and installations that push the physical and expressive capacities of the singing body. She combines radical vocal techniques, composition, improvisation, and intermedia dynamics alone and in collaboration. Snapper collaborated with performance artist Ron Athey on the piece Judas Cradle which toured throughout the U.K. and premiered in the U.S. at Walt Disney Concert Hall's REDCAT Theatre.  Her Five Fathoms Opera Project premiered in 2008 at P.S.1 Contemporary Art Center/MoMA NY. In May 2009, she collaborated with composer Andrew Infanti and costume designer Susan Matheson on the premiere of the world's first underwater opera You who will emerge from the flood at the Victoria Baths in Manchester, U.K.  It is part of an episodic and site-specific work that has since been staged in the U.S., France, Portugal, Poland, and Switzerland.

Her projects have been supported by grants and fellowships from The Metropolitan Opera Foundation, Arts Council of Great Britain, The Center for Research in Computing in the Arts, and The Durfee Foundation. Snapper lives in Los Angeles, CA.

References

  
  
  
 
 
 TDR: The Drama Review on Judas Cradle
 Nigel Brookes. "Prison, Perception, and the Humanity of Art" Concrete Magazine, July 2005.
 Amelia Jones, "Holy Bodies: Erotic Ethics in Ron Athey and Juliana Snapper's The Judas Cradle." The Drama Review, Vol. 49, Issue 3. Fall, 2005.
 Faye Hirsch, Review of Performa05. Art in America, February 2006.
 Cindy Center, "Podcast Interview 21: Juliana Snapper"
 Lisa Cazzato-Vieyra, "The Judas Cradle Documentary." (DVD) Native Voice Films, London, UK, 2006.
 Mojca Kumerdej, "Soprano Juliana Snapper's Underwater Sirensong," Delo, June 28, 2008
 Leija Svabic, "When Swimming Pool Turns Opera Stage," Triera, June 21, 2008
 Leah Gangitano, in Performa: New Visual Art Performance,. NY: Distributed Art Publishers, 2007

External links
Juliana Snapper official website

Living people
Year of birth missing (living people)
Oberlin Conservatory of Music alumni
University of California, San Diego alumni
American opera singers
Performance art in Los Angeles
American sound artists
Women sound artists
American performance artists